Umbilo is a central suburb of Durban, KwaZulu-Natal, South Africa.

The name is taken from the Umbilo River that flows through Pinetown and Queensburgh via the Umbilo canal and eventually into Natal Bay at Bayhead. Also written as Mbilo, it is of Zulu origin, meaning "boiling".

References

Suburbs of Durban